Dodge Township is one of seventeen townships in Boone County, Iowa, USA.  As of the 2000 census, its population was 540.

History
Dodge Township was organized in 1852. It is named for Augustus C. Dodge.

Geography
According to the USGS, it contains four cemeteries: Boone County Farm, Leininger, Mineral Ridge and White.

References

External links
 US-Counties.com
 City-Data.com

Townships in Boone County, Iowa
Townships in Iowa
1852 establishments in Iowa